Abdul Omar may refer to:

 Abdul Omar (boxer) (born 1993), Ghanaian boxer
 Abdul Rahman Omar (born 1945), Kenyan sport shooter